Spirembolus spirotubus is a species of sheet weaver found in the United States and Canada. It was described by Millidge in 1980.

References

Linyphiidae
Spiders of North America
Spiders described in 1980